Among the longest rivers of Mexico are 26 streams of at least . In the case of rivers such as the Colorado, the length listed in the table below is solely that of the main stem. In the case of the Grijalva and Usumacinta, it is the combined lengths of two river systems that share a delta. In the case of the Nazas and Aguanaval, it is the combined lengths of separate rivers that flow into the same closed basin.

Three rivers in this list cross international boundaries or form them. The Colorado and the Rio Grande (Río Bravo del Norte or Río Bravo) begin in the United States and flow into Mexico, while the Usumacinta begins in Guatemala and flows into Mexico. 

The primary source for the length, watershed, and surface runoff data in the table below is the 10th edition of Statistics on Water in Mexico, published by the National Water Commission in Mexico (CONAGUA); exceptions are as noted. U.S. states and departments of Guatemala appear in italics in the "States" column.

See also
List of rivers of Mexico
List of rivers of the Americas by coastline

Notes and references
Notes

References

Works cited
Benke, Arthur C., ed., and Cushing, Colbert E., ed. Rivers of North America. Burlington, Massachusetts: Elsevier Academic Press. .

Mexico